Raúl Domínguez Carral (born 1 November 1986) is a Spanish footballer who plays for CD Cayón as a goalkeeper.

Club career
Born in Santa María de Cayón, Cantabria, Domínguez started playing football with amateurs CD Guarnizo. In 2008, he moved to Asturias and joined Sporting de Gijón, first being assigned to the reserve side in the Segunda División B.

Domínguez made his first-team (and La Liga) debut on 21 May 2011, starting in a 0–0 away draw against Hércules CF with Sporting already safe from relegation and their opponents condemned.

References

External links

1986 births
Living people
People from the Pas and Miera Valleys
Spanish twins
Twin sportspeople
Spanish footballers
Footballers from Cantabria
Association football goalkeepers
La Liga players
Segunda División players
Segunda División B players
Tercera División players
Sporting de Gijón B players
Sporting de Gijón players
Sestao River footballers
Racing de Santander players